Antimachus was a sculptor of ancient Greece celebrated for his statues of women.

Notes

Ancient Greek sculptors